Raiymbek District is a district of Almaty Region in Kazakhstan. The administrative center of the district is the selo of Kegen. Population:

References

Districts of Kazakhstan
Almaty Region